The Sports Reporters  was a sports talk show that aired on ESPN at 9:30 a.m. ET every Sunday morning (and replayed at 10:30 a.m. ET the same day on ESPN2 and 11:30 AM on ESPNews). It featured a roundtable discussion among four sports media personalities, with one regular host and three rotating guests. The show began in 1988, patterned to some extent after the Chicago-based syndicated show called Sportswriters on TV.

The show was originally broadcast from a studio in Manhattan, and from 1999 to 2010 it was recorded at the ESPN Zone at Times Square in Manhattan before it closed. It then moved to Bristol, Connecticut at the main ESPN studios, where it stayed until the end of its run. On January 23, 2017, ESPN announced its planned cancellation, following the death of host John Saunders. The final episode aired May 7, 2017. The show would return in the form of a podcast in September 2017, produced now through Compass Media Networks.

Hosts and panelists
The Sports Reporters first aired in 1988 and was originally hosted by Gary Thorne, who was replaced by Dick Schaap later that year. Following Schaap's death in 2001, he was replaced by John Saunders, who hosted it until his own death in 2016.

The first year featured four rotating panelists, but afterwards there were three rotating panel members. Regular panelists included Mike Lupica of the New York Daily News, John Feinstein of The Washington Post, Mitch Albom of the Detroit Free Press, Michael Wilbon also from the Washington Post, Bob Ryan of the Boston Globe, William C. Rhoden of The New York Times, Ralph Wiley of Sports Illustrated and Stephen A. Smith of ESPN.

Former panelists included Jason Whitlock of Fox Sports 1, Christine Brennan of USA Today, Tony Kornheiser of The Washington Post, Mike Downey of the Los Angeles Times, Roy S. Johnson of The New York Times and Sports Illustrated, Bill Conlin of the Philadelphia Daily News and Bryan Burwell of the St. Louis Post Dispatch. As the show was based in New York City and then Bristol, Connecticut, the panelists were usually from the northeastern portion of the United States. For a long time, there were no women serving as regular panelists on the show, but in celebration of Title IX, one show in 2005 included three female sports journalists. In the show's later years, Selena Roberts of The New York Times and ESPN's Jemele Hill had made regular appearances on the show. The August 28, 2016, episode of the show made history with an all female edition of The Sports Reporters, with Hill as the moderator and fellow ESPN reporters Sarah Spain, Kate Fagan, and Jane McManus on the panel.

When Saunders was on assignment or unable to host due to illness, Lupica was usually the designated substitute host and became the permanent host after the death of Saunders in August 2016 until the final episode in May 2017. Dick's son Jeremy Schaap also guest-hosted on occasion.

September 16, 2001
The show was expanded to an hour to cover the sports perspective from the September 11th attacks. It also proved to be Dick Schaap's last show as he underwent hip replacement surgery and later died from complications. In fact, he delayed the surgery in order to be on that show.

November 15, 2015
The show covered the sports perspective from the November 2015 Paris attacks and how the attacks had an impact in the security system in sports facilities.

Death of Saunders
Host John Saunders died unexpectedly on August 10, 2016, at the age of 61. The August 14 episode, hosted by Mike Lupica, featured tributes to Saunders by the panelists.

Conclusion
After nearly 30 years on ESPN, the final episode of The Sports Reporters aired on May 7, 2017, with Lupica hosting, and Ryan, Rhoden, and Albom as the panelists.

Podcast
On September 8, 2017, The Sports Reporters relaunched as a twice weekly podcast co-hosted by Albom and Lupica with a rotating cast of the top sports writers in the business, including former panelists from the original ESPN program. It is produced through Compass Media Networks, rather than ESPN.  The podcast ceased producing episodes following the March 31, 2022 podcast.

References

External links
Current podcast website

1980s American television talk shows
1990s American television talk shows
2000s American television talk shows
2010s American television talk shows
American sports television series
ESPN original programming
1988 American television series debuts
2017 American television series endings
Television shows filmed in New York City
Television shows filmed in Connecticut